Moscow Township is a township in Freeborn County, Minnesota, United States. The population was 605 at the 2000 census.

Moscow Township was organized in 1858, and named after Moscow, in Russia.

Geography
According to the United States Census Bureau, the township has a total area of 36.2 square miles (93.9 km), of which 36.1 square miles (93.5 km)  is land and 0.1 square mile (0.3 km)  (0.36%) is water.

Demographics
As of the census of 2000, there were 605 people, 229 households, and 179 families residing in the township.  The population density was 16.8 people per square mile (6.5/km).  There were 257 housing units at an average density of 7.1/sq mi (2.7/km).  The racial makeup of the township was 97.52% White, 0.17% African American, 0.33% Asian, 1.32% from other races, and 0.66% from two or more races. Hispanic or Latino of any race were 3.64% of the population.

There were 229 households, out of which 35.8% had children under the age of 18 living with them, 68.6% were married couples living together, 5.7% had a female householder with no husband present, and 21.8% were non-families. 19.2% of all households were made up of individuals, and 9.6% had someone living alone who was 65 years of age or older.  The average household size was 2.64 and the average family size was 3.03.

In the township the population was spread out, with 26.1% under the age of 18, 6.9% from 18 to 24, 29.1% from 25 to 44, 23.5% from 45 to 64, and 14.4% who were 65 years of age or older.  The median age was 40 years. For every 100 females, there were 105.1 males.  For every 100 females age 18 and over, there were 105.0 males.

The median income for a household in the township was $38,472, and the median income for a family was $45,208. Males had a median income of $31,023 versus $26,058 for females. The per capita income for the township was $20,442.  About 8.3% of families and 9.4% of the population were below the poverty line, including 15.8% of those under age 18 and 6.6% of those age 65 or over.

References

Townships in Freeborn County, Minnesota
Townships in Minnesota